Pitar Ason (The Honor of Father) is a 2006 Bangladeshi Bengali-language romantic drama film directed by F I Manik.  It stars Shakib Khan, Apu Biswas, Nipun Akter, Razzak and Amin Khan in the lead roles. 

The film is the first released film of Nipun Akter.

Plot

Cast
 Shakib Khan as Selim Ahmed
 Apu Biswas as Dina
 Nipun as Raika
 Amin Khan
 Razzak
 Suchorita
 Ali Raj
 Nasrin
 Don
 Kazi Hayat
 Dipjol

Production

Crew
 Producer: Ami Boni Kothachoitro
 Story: Manik
 Screenplay: Manik
 Director: F I Manik

Technical details
 Format: 35 MM (Color)
 Running Time: 144 Minutes
 Original Language: Bengali
 Country of Origin: Bangladesh
 Date of Theatrical Release: 2006
 Year of the Product: 2006
 Technical Support: Bangladesh Film Development Corporation (BFDC)

Music

Pitar Ason film's music was directed by Bangladeshi famous music director Allauddin ali.

Soundtrack

References

2006 films
2006 romantic drama films
Bengali-language Bangladeshi films
Bangladeshi romantic drama films
Films scored by Alauddin Ali
2000s Bengali-language films